Masud Parvez (born 1947; known by his stage name Sohel Rana) is a Bangladeshi film actor, director and producer. At present, he is a presidium member of the Jatiya Party. He won Bangladesh National Film Award for Best Actor for his role in the film Ojante (1996), the Best Supporting Actor award for Sahoshi Manush Chai (2003) and the Bangladesh National Film Award for Lifetime Achievement 2019.

As Sohel Rana

Acting
Rana debuted producing films in 1972 with the film Ora Egaro Jon. He founded Parvez Films in 1983 which produced the first film, Masud Rana (1974).

Rana acted in television drama plays including Abar Joddha Habo (2014).

Politics
In 2012, Rana joined the Jatiya Party (Ershad) and was appointed as the presidium member of the party.

Filmography

Producer
 Ora Egaro Jon (1972)
 Masud Rana (1974)
 Bojro Mushti (1989)
 Oddrisho Shotru (2014)

Personal life
Rana is married to medical officer Zeenat Begum since 16 August 1990. Together they have one son - Mashroor Parvez.

References as Sohel Rana

As Sohel Rana 
 

Living people
People from Dhaka
Bangladeshi male film actors
20th-century Bangladeshi male actors
21st-century Bangladeshi male actors
Best Actor National Film Award (Bangladesh) winners
1947 births
Best Supporting Actor National Film Award (Bangladesh) winners
National Film Award (Bangladesh) for Lifetime Achievement recipients